Ali Hussein  (born 1 January 1950) is a former Iraqi football Defender  who played for Iraq in the 1976 AFC Asian Cup.

Ali played for the national team between 1973 and 1976.

References

Iraqi footballers
Iraq international footballers
1976 AFC Asian Cup players
Living people
1950 births
Association football defenders